Manoel Messias Silva Carvalho (born 26 February 1990 in Bacabal), simply known as Manoel, is a Brazilian professional footballer who plays as a central defender for Fluminense.

Honours

Club
Atlético Paranaense
Campeonato Paranaense: 2009

Cruzeiro
Campeonato Brasileiro Série A: 2014

Corinthians
Campeonato Paulista: 2019

Trabzonspor
Turkish Cup: 2019–20

Fluminense
Taça Guanabara: 2022
Campeonato Carioca: 2022

Individual
 Campeonato Brasileiro Série A Team of the Year: 2013

References

External links

1990 births
Living people
Sportspeople from Maranhão
Brazilian footballers
Association football defenders
Campeonato Brasileiro Série A players
Campeonato Brasileiro Série B players
Club Athletico Paranaense players
Cruzeiro Esporte Clube players
Sport Club Corinthians Paulista players
Trabzonspor footballers
Fluminense FC players
Brazilian expatriate footballers
Expatriate footballers in Turkey
Brazilian expatriate sportspeople in Turkey